The Museum of Applied Art ( / Muzej primenjene umetnosti) is an art museum in Belgrade, Serbia.

The museum contains over 37,000 works of applied art, which reflect the development of applied art over a 2,400 year span. The oldest artifacts of the museum are Ancient Greek coins from the 4th century BC.

History
The Museum of Applied Art was founded on 1950. In the first years of the existence of the museum, the museum bought a collection of over 3,000 artifacts from Ljuba Ivanović, an artist.

Departments
The museum is divided into seven departments with collections:
 Metal and Jewelry Department
 Textile and Costume Department
 Period Furniture and Wood Department
 Photography and Print Room Department
 Ceramics, Porcelain and Glass Department
 Contemporary Applied Art Department 
 Architecture, Urbanism and Architectural Design Department

The museum also has five specialized departments:
 Central Documentation Department
 Conservation Department
 Education Department
 Communication Department
 Library

Gallery

Notable collections
 Belgrade Armorial II

References

External links
 
 Museum of Applied Art in Belgrade on Europeana
 Museum of Applied Art in Belgrade. Digital Library

Further reading

External links

Museums in Belgrade
Art museums and galleries in Serbia
Decorative arts museums
Art museums established in 1950
1950 establishments in Serbia